Bobby Mills (28 August 1909 – 9 September 1978) was a former Australian rules footballer who played with Carlton and Footscray in the Victorian Football League (VFL).

Notes

External links 

Bobby Mills's profile at Blueseum

1909 births
1978 deaths
Carlton Football Club players
Western Bulldogs players
Australian rules footballers from Victoria (Australia)